Brzozowiec  (German Wilhelminenort) is a village in the administrative district of Gmina Namysłów, within Namysłów County, Opole Voivodeship, in south-western Poland.

References

Brzozowiec